Marie-Julie Baup (born 13 September 1979, Paris) is a French actress, writer, and comedian. Her work includes roles in Micmacs onscreen and A Midsummer Night's Dream onstage, and she has received several nominations for various Molière Awards and won the award for Best Supporting Actress in 2013. She is married to Lorànt Deutsch, whom she met while they were in a production of Amadeus in 2005.

Career 
After growing up in Yvelines, Baup found her career of choice when cast in a school play, The Bald Soprano, at age 11. In 2005, she performed her first major role in a 2005 adaptation of Amadeus alongside Jean Piat and Lorànt Deutsch at the Théâtre de Paris; she and Deutsch were separately nominated for the Molière Award for Best Newcomer for their performances. From 2006 to 2008, she played a role in The Importance of Being Earnest at the Théâtre Antoine-Simone Berriau. In 2009, she took the role of "Calculator" in Micmacs. In 2013, she won the Molière Award for Best Supporting Actress for her performance in a 2013 run of A Midsummer Night's Dream at the Théâtre de la Porte Saint-Martin. In 2014, she was nominated for another Molière award for her performance in the play Divina, once again for the Molière Award for Best Supporting Actress. Baup and husband Deutsch worked together once again for a 2015 revival of Irma La Douce, which was nominated for the Molière award for best musical.

Filmography

Film

Television

Theater

Awards and nominations

Personal life 
In 2005, Baup met Deutsch when they worked together during Amadeus. After working together for several more years while cast in The Importance of Being Earnest, they married in 2009 and now have three children.

References 

Living people
1979 births
French actresses
French comedians
People from Yvelines